Leó Frankel (also Léo Fränkel; 25 February 1844,  – 29 March 1896, Paris) was a Hungarian socialist revolutionary and labour leader of Jewish origin.

Life 
Trained as a goldsmith, he first went to work in Germany in 1861, where he became involved with Ferdinand Lassalle's Allgemeiner Deutscher Arbeiterverein sometime between 1865 and 1866. In 1867, he was appointed as the Paris correspondent for the Sozialdemokraten, a Lassallist journal published in Switzerland. In Paris he participated in the work of the First International, organizing German, Hungarian and other foreign workers within the city. Arrested in early 1870 for his political activity and being a member of the International, he was liberated by the revolution on 4 September 1870. During the Prussian Siege of Paris, he, along with other Internationalists, was highly critical of the Government of National Defense's efforts to oppose the Prussians. He also served as a member of the National Guard in defense of the city until its surrender to the Prussians on 28 January 1871.

On 26 March 1871 he was elected as a member of the Paris Commune. Upon the defeat of the Commune, wounded in its defence, the revolutionary escaped the impending death sentence to Switzerland, along with Elisabeth Dmitrieff. In 1871 he settled in London, where he joined the leadership of the First International.

He was extradited to Hungary by the Austrian police in 1876. From that point on, he was active organising the Hungarian workers' movement: he edited the German Language Arbeiter Wochen-Chronik and founded the Hungarian General Labour Party (1880)
He was convicted and sent to prison for a year and a half for the infringement of the prevailing press law in 1881. Upon his release he emigrated to  France once again.

He died in Paris in 1896. A commemorating obelisk was erected for him in Père Lachaise Cemetery  in Paris.

Honors
Hungary issued a commemorative postage stamp on 20 May 1951 on the 80th anniversary of Paris Commune.

References

External links
 Julien Chuzeville, Léo Frankel, communard sans frontières, 2021 
 Hungarian Biography Encyclopedia, 1000–1990 
 Biografías y Vidas 
 Leo Frankel，1844—1896

See also 

 :fr:Commune de Paris (1871) : Élus

1844 births
1896 deaths
Politicians from Budapest
Hungarian communists
Members of the International Workingmen's Association
Hungarian socialists
French socialists
Jewish socialists
Austrian socialists
German socialists
Hungarian emigrants to France
Hungarian prisoners and detainees
Prisoners and detainees of Austria-Hungary
Burials at Père Lachaise Cemetery
Communards